The history of Christianity concerns the Christian religion, Christian countries, and the Christians with their various denominations, from the 1st century to the present. Christianity originated with the ministry of Jesus, a Jewish teacher and healer who proclaimed the imminent Kingdom of God and was crucified  in Jerusalem in the Roman province of Judea. His followers believe that, according to the Gospels, he was the Son of God and that he died for the forgiveness of sins and was raised from the dead and exalted by God, and will return soon at the inception of God's kingdom.

The earliest followers of Jesus were apocalyptic Jewish Christians. The inclusion of Gentiles in the developing early Christian Church caused the separation of early Christianity from Judaism during the first two centuries of the Christian era. In 313, the Roman Emperor Constantine I issued the Edict of Milan legalizing Christian worship. In 380, with the Edict of Thessalonica put forth under Theodosius I, the Roman Empire officially adopted Trinitarian Christianity as its state religion, and Christianity established itself as a predominantly Roman religion in the state church of the Roman Empire. Various Christological debates about the human and divine nature of Jesus consumed the Christian Church for three centuries, and seven ecumenical councils were called to resolve these debates. Arianism was condemned at the First Council of Nicea (325), which supported the Trinitarian doctrine as expounded in the Nicene Creed.

In the Early Middle Ages, missionary activities spread Christianity towards the west and the north among Germanic peoples; towards the east among Armenians, Georgians, and Slavic peoples; in the Middle East among Syrians and Egyptians; in Eastern Africa among the Ethiopians; and further into Central Asia, China, and India. Christianity played a prominent role in the development of Western civilization, particularly in Europe from late antiquity and the Middle Ages. During the High Middle Ages, Eastern and Western Christianity grew apart, leading to the East–West Schism of 1054. Growing criticism of the Roman Catholic ecclesiastical structure and its corruption led to the Protestant Reformation and its related reform movements in the 15th and 16th centuries, which concluded with the European wars of religion that set off the split of Western Christianity. Since the Renaissance era, with the European colonization of the Americas and other continents actively instigated by the Christian churches, Christianity has expanded throughout the world. Today, there are more than two billion Christians worldwide and Christianity has become the world's largest religion. Within the last century, as the influence of Christianity has progressively waned in the Western world, Christianity continues to be the predominant religion in Europe (including Russia) and the Americas, and has rapidly grown in Asia as well as in the Global South and Third World countries, most notably in Latin America, China, South Korea, and much of Sub-Saharan Africa.

Origins

Jewish–Hellenistic background 

Christianity originated in 1st-century Judea from a sect of apocalyptic Jewish Christians within the realm of Second Temple Judaism. The basic tenets of the Jewish religion during this era were ethical monotheism and the Torah, or the Mosaic Law. In this period, the Second Temple of Jerusalem was still central to Judaism, but synagogues were also established as institutions for prayer and the reading of Jewish sacred texts. The Hebrew Bible developed during the Second Temple Period, as the Jews decided which religious texts were of divine origin; the Masoretic Text, compiled by the Jewish scribes and scholars of the Early Middle Ages, comprises the Hebrew and Aramaic 24 books that they considered authoritative.

The Hellenized Greek-speaking Jews of Alexandria produced a Greek translation of the Hebrew Bible called "the Septuagint", that included books later identified as the Apocrypha, while the Samaritans produced their own edition of the Torah, the Samaritan Pentateuch; according to the Dutch–Israeli biblical scholar and linguist Emanuel Tov, professor of Bible Studies at the Hebrew University of Jerusalem, both of these ancient editions of the Hebrew Bible differ significantly from the medieval Masoretic Text. Currently, all the main non-Protestant (Roman Catholic, Eastern Orthodox, and Oriental Orthodox) Christian denominations accept as canonical the Deuterocanonical books, which were excluded from the modern Hebrew Bible and the Protestant Bible. The Septuagint was influential on early Christianity as it was the Hellenistic Greek translation of the Hebrew Bible primarily used by the 1st-century Christian authors.

The religious, social, and political climate of 1st-century Roman Judea and its neighbouring provinces was extremely diverse and constantly characterized by socio-political turmoil, with numerous Judaic movements that were both religious and political. The ancient Roman–Jewish historian Flavius Josephus described the four most prominent sects within Second Temple Judaism: Pharisees, Sadducees, Essenes, and an unnamed "fourth philosophy", which modern historians recognize to be the Zealots and Sicarii. The 1st century BC and 1st century AD had numerous charismatic religious leaders contributing to what would become the Mishnah of Rabbinic Judaism, including the Jewish sages Yohanan ben Zakkai and Hanina ben Dosa. Jewish messianism, and the Jewish Messiah concept, has its roots in the apocalyptic literature produced between the 2nd century BC and the 1st century BC, promising a future "anointed" leader (messiah or king) from the Davidic line to resurrect the Israelite Kingdom of God, in place of the foreign rulers of the time.

Ministry of Jesus

The main sources of information regarding Jesus' life and teachings are the four canonical gospels, and to a lesser extent the Acts of the Apostles and the Pauline epistles. According to the Gospels, Jesus is the Son of God, who was crucified  in Jerusalem. His followers believed that he was raised from the dead and exalted by God, heralding the coming Kingdom of God.

Early Christianity (c. 31/33–324)

Early Christianity is generally reckoned by church historians to begin with the ministry of Jesus ( 27–30) and end with the First Council of Nicaea (325). It is typically divided into two periods: the Apostolic Age ( 30–100, when the first apostles were still alive) and the Ante-Nicene Period ( 100–325).

Apostolic Age 

The Apostolic Age is named after the Apostles and their missionary activities. It holds special significance in Christian tradition as the age of the direct apostles of Jesus. A primary source for the Apostolic Age is the Acts of the Apostles, but its historical accuracy has been debated and its coverage is partial, focusing especially from Acts 15 onwards on the ministry of Paul, and ending around 62 AD with Paul preaching in Rome under house arrest.

The earliest followers of Jesus were a sect of apocalyptic Jewish Christians within the realm of Second Temple Judaism. The early Christian groups were strictly Jewish, such as the Ebionites, and the early Christian community in Jerusalem, led by James the Just, brother of Jesus. According to Acts 9, they described themselves as "disciples of the Lord" and [followers] "of the Way", and according to Acts 11, a settled community of disciples at Antioch were the first to be called "Christians". Some of the early Christian communities attracted God-fearers, i.e. Greco-Roman sympathizers which made an allegiance to Judaism but refused to convert and therefore retained their Gentile (non-Jewish) status, who already visited Jewish synagogues. The inclusion of Gentiles posed a problem, as they could not fully observe the Halakha. Saul of Tarsus, commonly known as Paul the Apostle, persecuted the early Jewish Christians, then converted and started his mission among the Gentiles. The main concern of Paul's letters is the inclusion of Gentiles into God's New Covenant, sending the message that faith in Christ is sufficient for salvation. Because of this inclusion of Gentiles, early Christianity changed its character and gradually grew apart from Judaism during the first two centuries of the Christian Era. The fourth-century church fathers Eusebius and Epiphanius of Salamis cite a tradition that before the destruction of Jerusalem in AD 70 the Jerusalem Christians had been warned to flee to Pella in the region of the Decapolis across the Jordan River.

The Gospels and New Testament epistles contain early creeds and hymns, as well as accounts of the Passion, the empty tomb, and Resurrection appearances. Early Christianity spread to pockets of believers among Aramaic-speaking peoples along the Mediterranean coast and also to the inland parts of the Roman Empire and beyond, into the Parthian Empire and the later Sasanian Empire, including Mesopotamia, which was dominated at different times and to varying extent by these empires.

Ante-Nicene period

The ante-Nicene period (literally meaning "before Nicaea") was the period following the Apostolic Age down to the First Council of Nicaea in 325. By the beginning of the Nicene period, the Christian faith had spread throughout Western Europe and the Mediterranean Basin, and to North Africa and the East. A more formal Church structure grew out of the early communities, and various Christian doctrines developed. Christianity grew apart from Judaism, creating its own identity by an increasingly harsh rejection of Judaism and of Jewish practices.

Developing church structure
The number of Christians grew by approximately 40% per decade during the first and second centuries. In the post-Apostolic church a hierarchy of clergy gradually emerged as overseers of urban Christian populations took on the form of episkopoi (overseers, the origin of the terms bishop and episcopal) and presbyters (elders; the origin of the term priest) and then deacons (servants). But this emerged slowly and at different times in different locations. Clement, a 1st-century bishop of Rome, refers to the leaders of the Corinthian church in his epistle to Corinthians as bishops and presbyters interchangeably. The New Testament writers also use the terms overseer and elders interchangeably and as synonyms.

Variant Christianities

The Ante-Nicene period saw the rise of a great number of Christian sects, cults, and movements with strong unifying characteristics which were lacking in the apostolic period. They had different interpretations of the Bible, particularly regarding theological doctrines such as the divinity of Jesus and the nature of the Trinity. Many of the variations which existed during this time defy neat categorizations, because various forms of Christianity interacted in a complex fashion in order to form the dynamic character of Christianity which existed during this era. The Post-Apostolic period was diverse both in terms of beliefs and practices. In addition to the broad spectrum of general branches of Christianity, there was constant change and diversity that variably resulted in both internecine conflicts and syncretic adoption.

Development of the biblical canon

The letters of the Apostle Paul sent to the early Christian communities in Rome, Greece, and Asia Minor were circulating in collected form by the end of the 1st century. By the early 3rd century, there existed a set of early Christian writings similar to the current New Testament, though there were still disputes over the canonicity of texts such as the Epistle to the Hebrews, the Epistle of James, the First and Second Epistle of Peter, the First Epistle of John, and the Book of Revelation. By the 4th century, there existed unanimity in the Latin Church concerning the canonical texts included in the New Testament canon, and by the 5th century the Eastern Churches, with a few exceptions, had come to accept the Book of Revelation and thus had come into harmony on the matter of the canon.

Proto-Orthodox writings

As Christianity spread throughout the provinces of the Roman Empire and beyond its borders, it acquired certain members from high-ranking social classes and well-educated circles of the Hellenistic world; they sometimes became bishops. They produced two sorts of works, theological and apologetic, the latter being works aimed at defending the Christian faith by using reason, philosophy, and sacred scriptures to refute arguments against the veracity of Christianity. These authors are known as the Church Fathers, and the study of their lives and writings is called "patristics". Notable early Church Fathers include Ignatius of Antioch, Polycarp, Justin Martyr, Irenaeus, Clement of Alexandria, Tertullian, and Origen.

Early Christian art

Early Christian art and architecture emerged relatively late and the first known Christian images emerge from about 200 AD, although there is some literary evidence that small domestic images were used earlier. The oldest known Christian paintings are from the Roman catacombs, dated to about 200, and the oldest Christian sculptures are from sarcophagi, dating to the beginning of the 3rd century. The early rejection of images, and the necessity to hide Christian practice from persecution, left behind few written records regarding early Christianity and its evolution.

Persecutions and legalization

There was no empire-wide persecution of Christians until the reign of Decius in the 3rd century. The last and most severe persecution organised by the imperial Roman authorities was the Diocletianic Persecution, 303–311.

The Edict of Serdica was issued in 311 by the Roman Emperor Galerius, officially ending the persecution of Christians in the East. With the promulgation of the Edict of Milan (313), in which the Roman Emperors Constantine the Great and Licinius legalized the Christian religion, persecution of Christians by the Roman state ceased.

The Kingdom of Armenia became the first country in the world to establish Christianity as its state religion when, in an event traditionally dated to the year 301, Gregory the Illuminator convinced Tiridates III, the King of Armenia, to convert to Christianity.

Late antiquity (325–476)

Influence of Constantine

How much Christianity the Roman Emperor Constantine adopted at this point is difficult to discern, but his accession was a turning point for the Christian Church. He supported the Church financially, built various basilicas, granted privileges (e.g., exemption from certain taxes) to clergy, promoted Christians to some high offices, and returned confiscated property. Constantine played an active role in the leadership of the Church. In 316, he acted as a judge in a North African dispute concerning the Donatist controversy. More significantly, in 325 he summoned the Council of Nicaea, the first ecumenical council. He thus established a precedent for the emperor as responsible to God for the spiritual health of his subjects, and thus with a duty to maintain orthodoxy. He was to enforce doctrine, root out heresy, and uphold ecclesiastical unity.

The successor of Constantine's son, his nephew Julian, under the influence of his adviser Mardonius, renounced Christianity and embraced a Neoplatonic and mystical form of Greco-Roman Paganism, shocking the Christian establishment. He attempted to revive Greco-Roman Paganism in the Roman Empire and began by reopening the Pagan temples, modifying them to resemble Christian traditions, such as the episcopal structure and public charity (previously unknown in the Greco-Roman religion). Julian's short reign ended when he was wounded in the Battle of Samarra and died days later during the expedition against the Sasanian Empire (363).

Arianism and the first ecumenical councils

An increasingly popular Nontrinitarian Christological doctrine that spread throughout the Roman Empire from the 4th century onwards was Arianism, founded by the Christian presbyter Arius from Alexandria, Egypt, which taught that Jesus Christ is a creature distinct from and subordinate to God the Father.

Although the Arian doctrine was condemned as heresy and eventually eliminated by the State church of the Roman Empire, it remained popular underground for some time. In the late 4th century, Ulfilas, a Roman Arian bishop, was appointed as the first Christian missionary to the Goths, the Germanic peoples in much of Europe at the borders of and within the Roman Empire. Ulfilas spread Arian Christianity among the Goths, firmly establishing the faith among many of the Germanic tribes, thus helping to keep them culturally and religiously distinct from Chalcedonian Christians.

During this age, the first ecumenical councils were convened. They were mostly concerned with Christological and theological disputes. The First Council of Nicaea (325) and the First Council of Constantinople (381) resulted in condemnation of Arian teachings as heresy and produced the Nicene Creed.

Christianity as Roman state religion

On 27 February 380, with the Edict of Thessalonica put forth under Theodosius I, Gratian, and Valentinian II, the Roman Empire officially adopted Trinitarian Christianity as its state religion. Prior to this date, Constantius II and Valens had personally favoured Arian or Semi-Arian forms of Christianity, but Valens' successor Theodosius I supported the Trinitarian doctrine as expounded in the Nicene Creed.

After its establishment, the Church adopted the same organisational boundaries as the Empire: geographical provinces, called dioceses, corresponding to imperial government territorial divisions. The bishops, who were located in major urban centres as in pre-legalisation tradition, thus oversaw each diocese. The bishop's location was his "seat", or "see". Among the sees, five came to hold special eminence: Rome, Constantinople, Jerusalem, Antioch, and Alexandria. The prestige of most of these sees depended in part on their apostolic founders, from whom the bishops were therefore the spiritual successors. Though the bishop of Rome was still held to be the First among equals, Constantinople was second in precedence as the new capital of the empire.

Theodosius I decreed that others not believing in the preserved "faithful tradition", such as the Trinity, were to be considered to be practitioners of illegal heresy, and in 385, this resulted in the first case of the state, not Church, infliction of capital punishment on a heretic, namely Priscillian.

Church of the East and the Sasanian Empire

During the early 5th century, the School of Edessa had taught a Christological perspective stating that Christ's divine and human nature were distinct persons. A particular consequence of this perspective was that Mary could not be properly called the mother of God but could only be considered the mother of Christ. The most widely known proponent of this viewpoint was the Patriarch of Constantinople Nestorius. Since referring to Mary as the mother of God had become popular in many parts of the Church this became a divisive issue.

The Roman Emperor Theodosius II called for the Council of Ephesus (431), with the intention of settling the issue. The council ultimately rejected Nestorius' view. Many churches who followed the Nestorian viewpoint broke away from the Roman Church, causing a major schism. The Nestorian churches were persecuted, and many followers fled to the Sasanian Empire where they were accepted. The Sasanian (Persian) Empire had many Christian converts early in its history, tied closely to the Syriac branch of Christianity. The Sasanian Empire was officially Zoroastrian and maintained a strict adherence to this faith, in part to distinguish itself from the religion of the Roman Empire (originally the Greco-Roman Paganism and then Christianity). Christianity became tolerated in the Sasanian Empire, and as the Roman Empire increasingly exiled heretics during the 4th and 6th centuries, the Sasanian Christian community grew rapidly. By the end of the 5th century, the Persian Church was firmly established and had become independent of the Roman Church. This church evolved into what is today known as the Church of the East.

In 451, the Council of Chalcedon was held to further clarify the Christological issues surrounding Nestorianism. The council ultimately stated that Christ's divine and human nature were separate but both part of a single entity, a viewpoint rejected by many churches who called themselves miaphysites. The resulting schism created a communion of churches, including the Armenian, Syrian, and Egyptian churches. Though efforts were made at reconciliation in the next few centuries, the schism remained permanent, resulting in what is today known as Oriental Orthodoxy.

Christianity in the Roman Africa province 

Informal primacy was exercised by the Archdiocese of Carthage, a metropolitan archdiocese also known as "Church of Carthage". The Church of Carthage thus was to the Early African church what the Church of Rome was to the Catholic Church in Italy. Famous figures include Saint Perpetua, Saint Felicitas, and their Companions (died c. 203), Tertullian (c. 155–240), Cyprian  (c. 200–258), Caecilianus (floruit 311), Saint Aurelius (died 429), Augustine of Hippo (died 430), and Eugenius of Carthage (died 505). Tertullian and Cyprian are both considered Latin Church Fathers of the Latin Church. Tertullian, a theologian of part Berber descent, was instrumental in the development of trinitarian theology, and was the first to apply Latin language extensively in his theological writings. As such, Tertullian has been called "the father of Latin Christianity" and "the founder of Western theology." Carthage remained an important center of Christianity, hosting several councils of Carthage.

Donatism was a Christian sect leading to a schism in the Church, in the region of the Church of Carthage, from the fourth to the sixth centuries.  Donatists argued that Christian clergy must be faultless for their ministry to be effective and their prayers and sacraments to be valid. Donatism had its roots in the long-established Christian community of the Roman province Africa Proconsularis (present-day Tunisia, Morocco, the northeast of Algeria, and the western coast of Libya), in the persecutions of Christians under Diocletian. Named after the Berber Christian bishop Donatus Magnus, Donatism flourished during the fourth and fifth centuries.

Monasticism

Monasticism is a form of asceticism whereby one renounces worldly pursuits and goes off alone as a hermit or joins a tightly organized community. It began early in the Christian Church as a family of similar traditions, modelled upon Scriptural examples and ideals, and with roots in certain strands of Judaism. John the Baptist is seen as an archetypical monk, and monasticism was inspired by the organisation of the Apostolic community as recorded in Acts 2:42–47.

Notable Christian authors of Late Antiquity such as Origen, St Jerome, John Chrysostom, and Augustine of Hippo, interpreted meanings of the Biblical texts within a highly asceticized religious environment. Scriptural examples of asceticism could be found in the lives of John the Baptist, Jesus Christ, the twelve apostles, and Paul the Apostle. The Dead Sea Scrolls revealed ascetic practices of the ancient Jewish sect of Essenes who took vows of abstinence to prepare for a holy war. An emphasis on an ascetic religious life was evident in both early Christian writings (see: Philokalia) and practices (see: Hesychasm). Other Christian practitioners of asceticism include saints such as Paul the Hermit, Simeon Stylites, David of Wales, John of Damascus, and Francis of Assisi.

The deserts of the Middle East were at one time inhabited by thousands of male and female Christian ascetics, hermits and anchorites, including St. Anthony the Great (otherwise known as St. Anthony of the Desert), St. Mary of Egypt, and St. Simeon Stylites, collectively known as the Desert Fathers and Desert Mothers. In 963 an association of monasteries called Lavra was formed on Mount Athos, in Eastern Orthodox tradition. This became the most important center of orthodox Christian ascetic groups in the centuries that followed. In the modern era, Mount Athos and Meteora have remained a significant center.

Eremitic monks, or hermits, live in solitude, whereas cenobitics live in communities, generally in a monastery, under a rule (or code of practice) and are governed by an abbot. Originally, all Christian monks were hermits, following the example of Anthony the Great. However, the need for some form of organised spiritual guidance lead Pachomius in 318 to organise his many followers in what was to become the first monastery. Soon, similar institutions were established throughout the Egyptian desert as well as the rest of the eastern half of the Roman Empire. Women were especially attracted to the movement. Central figures in the development of monasticism were Basil the Great in the East and, in the West, Benedict, who created the Rule of Saint Benedict, which would become the most common rule throughout the Middle Ages and the starting point for other monastic rules.

Early Middle Ages (476–842)

The transition into the Early Middle Ages was a gradual and localised process. Rural areas rose as power centres whilst urban areas declined. Although a greater number of Christians remained in the East (Greek areas), important developments were underway in the West (Latin areas), and each took on distinctive shapes. The bishops of Rome, the popes, were forced to adapt to drastically changing circumstances. Maintaining only nominal allegiance to the emperor, they were forced to negotiate balances with the "barbarian rulers" of the former Roman provinces. In the East, the Church maintained its structure and character and evolved more slowly.

In terms of prosperity and cultural life, the Byzantine Empire was one of the peaks in Christian history and Christian civilization, and Constantinople remained the leading city of the Christian world in size, wealth, and culture. There was a renewed interest in classical Greek philosophy, as well as an increase in literary output in vernacular Greek. Byzantine art and literature held a preeminent place in Europe, and the cultural impact of Byzantine art on the West during this period was enormous and of long-lasting significance. The later rise of Islam in North Africa reduced the size and numbers of Christian congregations, leaving in large numbers only the Coptic Church in Egypt, the Ethiopian Orthodox Tewahedo Church in the Horn of Africa and the Nubian Church in the Sudan (Nobatia, Makuria and Alodia).

Western missionary expansion

The stepwise loss of Western Roman Empire dominance, replaced with foederati and Germanic kingdoms, coincided with early missionary efforts into areas not controlled by the collapsing empire. As early as in the 5th century, missionary activities from Roman Britain into the Celtic areas (Scotland, Ireland, and Wales) produced competing early traditions of Celtic Christianity, that was later reintegrated under the Church in Rome. Prominent missionaries in Northwestern Europe of the time were the Christian saints Patrick, Columba, and Columbanus. The Anglo-Saxon tribes that invaded Southern Britain some time after the Roman abandonment were initially Pagans but were converted to Christianity by Augustine of Canterbury on the mission of Pope Gregory the Great. Soon becoming a missionary centre, missionaries such as Wilfrid, Willibrord, Lullus, and Boniface converted their Saxon relatives in Germania.

The largely Christian Gallo-Roman inhabitants of Gaul (modern France and Belgium) were overrun by the Franks in the early 5th century. The native inhabitants were persecuted until the Frankish King Clovis I converted from Paganism to Roman Catholicism in 496. Clovis insisted that his fellow nobles follow suit, strengthening his newly established kingdom by uniting the faith of the rulers with that of the ruled. After the rise of the Frankish Kingdom and the stabilizing political conditions, the Western part of the Church increased the missionary activities, supported by the Merovingian dynasty as a means to pacify troublesome neighbour peoples. After the foundation of a church in Utrecht by Willibrord, backlashes occurred when the Pagan Frisian King Radbod destroyed many Christian centres between 716 and 719. In 717, the English missionary Boniface was sent to aid Willibrord, re-establishing churches in Frisia and continuing missions in Germany. During the late 8th century, Charlemagne used mass killings in order to subjugate the Pagan Saxons and forcibly compel them to accept Christianity.

Rashidun Caliphate
Since they are considered "People of the Book" in the Islamic religion, Christians under Muslim rule were subjected to the status of dhimmi (along with Jews, Samaritans, Gnostics, Mandeans, and Zoroastrians), which was inferior to the status of Muslims. Christians and other religious minorities thus faced religious discrimination and persecution in that they were banned from proselytising (for Christians, it was forbidden to evangelize or spread Christianity) in the lands invaded by the Arab Muslims on pain of death, they were banned from bearing arms, undertaking certain professions, and were obligated to dress differently in order to distinguish themselves from Arabs. Under the Islamic law (sharīʿa), Non-Muslims were obligated to pay the jizya and kharaj taxes, together with periodic heavy ransom levied upon Christian communities by Muslim rulers in order to fund military campaigns, all of which contributed a significant proportion of income to the Islamic states while conversely reducing many Christians to poverty, and these financial and social hardships forced many Christians to convert to Islam. Christians unable to pay these taxes were forced to surrender their children to the Muslim rulers as payment who would sell them as slaves to Muslim households where they were forced to convert to Islam.

According to the tradition of the Syriac Orthodox Church, the Muslim conquest of the Levant was a relief for Christians oppressed by the Western Roman Empire. Michael the Syrian, patriarch of Antioch, wrote later that the Christian God had "raised from the south the children of Ishmael to deliver us by them from the hands of the Romans". Various Christian communities in the regions of Palestine, Syria, Lebanon, and Armenia resented either towards the governance of the Western Roman Empire or that of the Byzantine Empire, and therefore preferred to live under more favourable economic and political conditions as dhimmi under the Muslim rulers. However, modern historians also recognize that the Christian populations living in the lands invaded by the Arab Muslim armies between the 7th and 10th centuries AD suffered religious persecution, religious violence, and martyrdom multiple times at the hands of Arab Muslim officials and rulers; many were executed under the Islamic death penalty for defending their Christian faith through dramatic acts of resistance such as refusing to convert to Islam, repudiation of the Islamic religion and subsequent reconversion to Christianity, and blasphemy towards Muslim beliefs.

Umayyad Caliphate

According to the Ḥanafī school of Islamic law (sharīʿa), the testimony of a Non-Muslim (such as a Christian or a Jew) was not considered valid against the testimony of a Muslim in legal or civil matters. Historically, in Islamic culture and traditional Islamic law Muslim women have been forbidden from marrying Christian or Jewish men, whereas Muslim men have been permitted to marry Christian or Jewish women (see: Interfaith marriage in Islam). Christians under Islamic rule had the right to convert to Islam or any other religion, while conversely a murtad, or an apostate from Islam, faced severe penalties or even hadd, which could include the Islamic death penalty.

In general, Christians subject to Islamic rule were allowed to practice their religion with some notable limitations stemming from the apocryphal Pact of Umar. This treaty, supposedly enacted in 717 AD, forbade Christians from publicly displaying the cross on church buildings, from summoning congregants to prayer with a bell, from re-building or repairing churches and monasteries after they had been destroyed or damaged, and imposed other restrictions relating to occupations, clothing, and weapons. The Umayyad Caliphate persecuted many Berber Christians in the 7th and 8th centuries AD, who slowly converted to Islam.

In Umayyad al-Andalus (the Iberian Peninsula), the Mālikī school of Islamic law was the most prevalent. The martyrdoms of forty-eight Christian martyrs that took place in the Emirate of Córdoba between 850 and 859 AD are recorded in the hagiographical treatise written by the Iberian Christian and Latinist scholar Eulogius of Córdoba. The Martyrs of Córdoba were executed under the rule of Abd al-Rahman II and Muhammad I, and Eulogius' hagiography describes in detail the executions of the martyrs for capital violations of Islamic law, including apostasy and blasphemy.

Abbasid Caliphate
Eastern Christian scientists and scholars of the medieval Islamic world (particularly Jacobite and Nestorian Christians) contributed to the Arab Islamic civilization during the reign of the Umayyad and the Abbasid, by translating works of Greek philosophers to Syriac and afterwards, to Arabic. They also excelled in philosophy, science, theology, and medicine. And the personal physicians of the Abbasid Caliphs were often Assyrian Christians such as the long serving Bukhtishu dynast

The Abbasid Caliphate was less tolerant of Christianity than had been the Umayyad caliphs. Nonetheless, Christian officials continued to be employed in the government, and the Christians of the Church of the East were often tasked with the translation of Ancient Greek philosophy and Greek mathematics. The writings of al-Jahiz attacked Christians for being too prosperous, and indicates they were able to ignore even those restrictions placed on them by the state. In the late 9th century, the patriarch of Jerusalem, Theodosius, wrote to his colleague the patriarch of Constantinople Ignatios that "they are just and do us no wrong nor show us any violence".

Elias of Heliopolis, having moved to Damascus from Heliopolis (Ba'albek), was accused of apostasy from Christianity after attending a party held by a Muslim Arab, and was forced to flee Damascus for his hometown, returning eight years later, where he was recognized and imprisoned by the "eparch", probably the jurist al-Layth ibn Sa'd. After refusing to convert to Islam under torture, he was brought before the Damascene emir and relative of the caliph al-Mahdi, Muhammad ibn-Ibrahim, who promised good treatment if Elias would convert. On his repeated refusal, Elias was tortured and beheaded and his body burnt, cut up, and thrown into the river Chrysorrhoes (the Barada) in 779 AD.

According to the Synaxarion of Constantinople, the hegumenos Michael of Zobe and thirty-six of his monks at the Monastery of Zobe near Sebasteia (Sivas) were killed by a raid on the community. The perpetrator was the "emir of the Hagarenes", "Alim", probably Ali ibn-Sulayman, an Abbasid governor who raided Roman territory in 785 AD. Bacchus the Younger was beheaded in Jerusalem in 786–787 AD. Bacchus was Palestinian, whose family, having been Christian, had been converted to Islam by their father. Bacchus however, remained crypto-Christian and undertook a pilgrimage to Jerusalem, upon which he was baptized and entered the monastery of Mar Saba. Reunion with his family prompted their reconversion to Christianity and Bacchus's trial and execution for apostasy under the governing emir Harthama ibn A'yan.

After the 838 Sack of Amorium, the hometown of the emperor Theophilos and his Amorian dynasty, the caliph al-Mu'tasim took more than forty Roman prisoners. These were taken to the capital, Samarra, where after seven years of theological debates and repeated refusals to convert to Islam, they were put to death in March 845 under the caliph al-Wathiq. Within a generation they were venerated as the 42 Martyrs of Amorium. According to their hagiographer Euodius, probably writing within a generation of the events, the defeat at Amorium was to be blamed on Theophilos and his iconoclasm. According to some later hagiographies, including one by one of several Middle Byzantine writers known as Michael the Synkellos, among the forty-two were Kallistos, the doux of the Koloneian thema, and the heroic martyr Theodore Karteros.

During the 10th-century phase of the Arab–Byzantine wars, the victories of the Romans over the Arabs resulted in mob attacks on Christians, who were believed to sympathize with the Roman state. According to Bar Hebraeus, the catholicus of the Church of the East, Abraham III, wrote to the grand vizier that "we Nestorians are the friends of the Arabs and pray for their victories". The attitude of the Nestorians "who have no other king but the Arabs", he contrasted with the Greek Orthodox Church, whose emperors he said "had never cease to make war against the Arabs. Between 923 and 924 AD, several Orthodox churches were destroyed in mob violence in Ramla, Ashkelon, Caesarea Maritima, and Damascus. In each instance, according to the Arab Melkite Christian chronicler Eutychius of Alexandria, the caliph al-Muqtadir contributed to the rebuilding of ecclesiastical property.

Byzantine Iconoclasm

Following a series of heavy military reverses against the Muslims, Iconoclasm emerged within the provinces of the Byzantine Empire in the early 8th century. In the years 720s, the Byzantine Emperor Leo III the Isaurian banned the pictorial representation of Christ, saints, and biblical scenes. In the Latin West, Pope Gregory III held two synods at Rome and condemned Leo's actions. The Byzantine Iconoclast Council, held at Hieria in 754 AD, ruled that holy portraits were heretical. The iconoclastic movement destroyed much of the Christian Church's early artistic history. The iconoclastic movement was later defined as heretical in 787 AD under the Second Council of Nicaea (the seventh ecumenical council) but had a brief resurgence between 815 and 842 AD.

High Middle Ages (800–1299)

Carolingian Renaissance

The Carolingian Renaissance was a period of intellectual and cultural revival of literature, arts, and scriptural studies during the late 8th and 9th centuries under the rule of the Carolingian dynasty, mostly during the reigns of the Frankish kings Charlemagne, founder and first Emperor of the Carolingian Empire, and his son, Louis the Pious. To address the problems of illiteracy among clergy and court scribes, Charlemagne founded schools and attracted the most learned men from all of Europe to his court.

Growing tensions between East and West

Tensions in Christian unity started to become evident in the 4th century. Two basic problems were involved: the nature of the primacy of the bishop of Rome and the theological implications of adding a clause to the Nicene Creed, known as the filioque clause. These doctrinal issues were first openly discussed in Photius's patriarchate. The Eastern churches viewed Rome's understanding of the nature of episcopal power as being in direct opposition to the Church's essentially conciliar structure and thus saw the two ecclesiologies as mutually antithetical.

Another issue developed into a major irritant to Eastern Christendom, the gradual introduction into the Nicene Creed in the West of the Filioque clause – meaning "and the Son" – as in "the Holy Spirit ... proceeds from the Father and the Son", where the original Creed, sanctioned by the councils and still used today by the Eastern Orthodox, simply states "the Holy Spirit, ... proceeds from the Father." The Eastern Church argued that the phrase had been added unilaterally and therefore illegitimately, since the East had never been consulted. In addition to this ecclesiological issue, the Eastern Church also considered the Filioque clause unacceptable on dogmatic grounds.

Photian schism

In the 9th century, a controversy arose between Eastern (Byzantine, Greek Orthodox) and Western (Latin, Roman Catholic) Christianity that was precipitated by the opposition of the Roman Pope John VII to the appointment by the Byzantine Emperor Michael III of Photios I to the position of patriarch of Constantinople. Photios was refused an apology by the pope for previous points of dispute between the East and West. Photios refused to accept the supremacy of the pope in Eastern matters or accept the Filioque clause. The Latin delegation at the council of his consecration pressed him to accept the clause in order to secure their support. The controversy also involved Eastern and Western ecclesiastical jurisdictional rights in the Bulgarian church. Photios did provide concession on the issue of jurisdictional rights concerning Bulgaria, and the papal legates made do with his return of Bulgaria to Rome. This concession, however, was purely nominal, as Bulgaria's return to the Byzantine rite in 870 had already secured for it an autocephalous church. Without the consent of Boris I of Bulgaria, the papacy was unable to enforce any of its claims.

East–West Schism (1054)

The East–West Schism, also known as the "Great Schism", separated the Church into Western (Latin) and Eastern (Greek) branches, i.e., Western Catholicism and Eastern Orthodoxy. It was the first major division since certain groups in the East rejected the decrees of the Council of Chalcedon (see Oriental Orthodoxy) and was far more significant. Though normally dated to 1054, the East–West Schism was actually the result of an extended period of estrangement between Latin and Greek Christendom over the nature of papal primacy and certain doctrinal matters regarding the Filioque, but intensified from cultural, geographical, geopolitical, and linguistic differences.

Monastic reform

From the 6th century onward, most of the monasteries in the Catholic West belonged to the Benedictine Order. Owing to the stricter adherence to a reformed Benedictine rule, the Abbey of Cluny became the acknowledged leading centre of Western monasticism from the later 10th century. Cluny created a large, federated order in which the administrators of subsidiary houses served as deputies of the abbot of Cluny and answered to him. The Cluniac spirit was a revitalising influence on the Norman Church, at its height from the second half of the 10th century through the early 12th century.

The next wave of monastic reform came with the Cistercian movement. The first Cistercian abbey was founded in 1098, at Cîteaux Abbey. The keynote of Cistercian life was a return to a literal observance of the Benedictine rule, rejecting the developments of the Benedictines. The most striking feature in the reform was the return to manual labour, and especially to field-work. Inspired by Bernard of Clairvaux, the primary builder of the Cistercians, they became the main force of technological advancement and diffusion in medieval Europe. By the end of the 12th century, the Cistercian houses numbered 500, and at its height in the 15th century the order claimed to have close to 750 houses. Most of these were built in wilderness areas, and played a major part in bringing such isolated parts of Europe into economic cultivation.

A third level of monastic reform was provided by the establishment of the Mendicant orders. Commonly known as "friars", mendicants live under a monastic rule with traditional vows of poverty, chastity, and obedience but they emphasise preaching, missionary activity, and education, in a secluded monastery. Beginning in the 12th century, the Franciscan Order was instituted by the followers of Francis of Assisi, and thereafter the Dominican Order was begun by St. Dominic.

Rise of universities
Modern western universities have their origins directly in the Medieval Church. They began as cathedral schools, and all students were considered clerics. This was a benefit as it placed the students under ecclesiastical jurisdiction and thus imparted certain legal immunities and protections. The cathedral schools eventually became partially detached from the cathedrals and formed their own institutions, the earliest being the University of Bologna (1088), the University of Oxford (1096), and the University of Paris (c. 1150).

Investiture controversy

The Investiture controversy, otherwise referred to as the "Lay Investiture controversy", was the most significant conflict between secular and religious powers that took place in medieval Europe. It began as a dispute in the 11th century between the Holy Roman Emperor Henry IV and Pope Gregory VII concerning who would appoint bishops (investiture). The end of lay investiture threatened to undercut the power of the Holy Roman Empire and the ambitions of the European nobility. Bishoprics being merely lifetime appointments, a king could better control their powers and revenues than those of hereditary noblemen. Even better, he could leave the post vacant and collect the revenues, theoretically in trust for the new bishop, or give a bishopric to pay a helpful noble. The Roman Catholic Church wanted to end lay investiture to end this and other abuses, to reform the episcopate and provide better pastoral care. Pope Gregory VII issued the Dictatus Papae, which declared that the pope alone could appoint bishops. Henry IV's rejection of the decree led to his excommunication and a ducal revolt. Eventually, Henry IV received absolution after a dramatic public penance, though the Great Saxon Revolt and conflict of investiture continued.

A similar controversy occurred in England between King Henry I and St. Anselm, Archbishop of Canterbury, over investiture and episcopal vacancy. The English dispute was resolved by the Concordat of London (1107), where the king renounced his claim to invest bishops but continued to require an oath of fealty. This was a partial model for the Concordat of Worms (Pactum Calixtinum), which resolved the Imperial investiture controversy with a compromise that allowed secular authorities some measure of control but granted the selection of bishops to their cathedral canons. As a symbol of the compromise, both ecclesiastical and lay authorities invested bishops with the staff and the ring, respectively.

Crusades 

Generally, the Crusades (1095–1291) refer to the European Christian campaigns in the Holy Land sponsored by the Papacy against Muslims in order to reconquer the region of Palestine. There were other Crusader expeditions against the Islamic forces in the Mediterranean, primarily in Southern Spain, Southern Italy, and the islands of Cyprus, Malta, and Sicily. The Papacy also sponsored numerous Crusades against the Pagan peoples of Northeastern Europe in order to subjugate and forcibly convert them to Christianity, against its political enemies in Western Europe, and against heretical or schismatic religious minorities within European Christendom.

The Holy Land had been part of the Roman Empire, and thus subsequently of the Byzantine Empire, until the Arab Muslim invasions of the 7th and 8th centuries. Thereafter, Christians had generally been permitted to visit the sacred places in the Holy Land until 1071, when the Seljuk Turks closed Christian pilgrimages and assailed the Byzantines, defeating them at the Battle of Manzikert. Emperor Alexius I asked for aid from Pope Urban II against Islamic aggression. He probably expected money from the pope for the hiring of mercenaries. Instead, Urban II called upon the knights of Christendom in a speech made at the Council of Clermont on 27 November 1095, combining the idea of pilgrimage to the Holy Land with that of waging a holy war against infidels.

The First Crusade captured Antioch in 1099 and then Jerusalem. The Second Crusade occurred in 1145 when Edessa was taken by Islamic forces. Jerusalem was held until 1187 and the Third Crusade, after battles between Richard the Lionheart and Saladin. The Fourth Crusade, begun by Innocent III in 1202, intended to retake the Holy Land but was soon subverted by the Venetians. When the crusaders arrived in Constantinople, they sacked the city and other parts of Asia Minor and established the Latin Empire of Constantinople in Greece and Asia Minor. Five numbered crusades to the Holy Land, culminating in the siege of Acre of 1219, essentially ending the Western presence in the Holy Land.

Jerusalem was held by the crusaders for nearly a century, while other strongholds in the Near East remained in Christian possession much longer. The crusades in the Holy Land ultimately failed to establish permanent Christian kingdoms. Islamic expansion into Europe remained a threat for centuries, culminating in the campaigns of Suleiman the Magnificent in the 16th century. Crusades in Iberia (the Reconquista), southern Italy, and Sicily eventually lead to the demise of Islamic power in Europe. The Albigensian Crusade targeted the heretical Cathars of southern France; in combination with the Inquisition set up in its aftermath, it succeeded in exterminating them. The Wendish Crusade succeeded in subjugating and forcibly converting the pagan Slavs of modern eastern Germany. The Livonian Crusade, carried out by the Teutonic Knights and other orders of warrior-monks, similarly conquered and forcibly converted the pagan Balts of Livonia and Old Prussia. However, the pagan Grand Duchy of Lithuania successfully resisted the Knights and converted only voluntarily in the 14th century.

Medieval Inquisition

The Medieval Inquisition was a series of inquisitions (Roman Catholic ecclesiastical bodies charged with suppressing Christian movements that they regarded as heretical) from around 1184, including the Episcopal Inquisition (1184–1230) and later the Papal Inquisition (1230s–1240s). It was established in response to the Christian movements within Europe considered apostate or heretical to Western Catholicism, in particular the Bogomils, Cathars (or Albigensians), Waldensians, Beguines and Beghards, Lollards, Hussites, and European Jews, which were respectively disseminated in the Bulgarian Empire, Southern France, Northern Italy, the Flanders and Rhineland, England, the Lands of the Bohemian Crown, and the territories united under the Crown of Aragon. These were the first inquisition movements of many that would follow in European Christendom.

Spread of Christianity

Early evangelization of Scandinavia was carried out by the Christianized Anglo-Saxons throughout their missions in the Scandinavian Peninsula; the most notable of the Anglo-Saxon missionaries was Ansgar, Archbishop of Bremen, nicknamed "Apostle of the North". Ansgar, a native of Amiens, was sent with a group of monks to Jutland, Denmark around the year 820, at the time of the pro-Christian King Harald Klak. The mission was only partially successful, and Ansgar returned two years later to Germany, after Harald had been driven out of his kingdom. In 829, Ansgar went to Birka on Lake Mälaren, Sweden, with his aide friar Witmar, and a small congregation was formed in 831 which included the king's steward Hergeir. Conversion was slow, however, and most Scandinavian lands were only completely Christianised at the time of rulers such as Saint Canute IV of Denmark and Olaf I of Norway in the years following AD 1000.

The Christianization of the Slavs was initiated by one of Byzantium's most learned churchmen—the patriarch Photios I of Constantinople. The Byzantine Emperor Michael III chose Cyril and Methodius in response to a request from King Rastislav of Moravia, who wanted missionaries that could minister to the Moravians in their own language. The two brothers spoke the local Slavonic vernacular and translated the Bible and many of the prayer books. As the translations prepared by them were copied by speakers of other dialects, the hybrid literary language Old Church Slavonic was created, which later evolved into Church Slavonic and is the common liturgical language still used by the Russian Orthodox Church and other Slavic Orthodox Christians. Methodius went on to convert the Serbs.

Bulgaria was a Pagan country since its establishment in 681 until 864, when Boris I converted to Christianity. The reasons for that decision were complex; the most important factors were that Bulgaria was situated between two powerful Christian empires, Byzantium and East Francia; Christian doctrine particularly favoured the position of the monarch as God's representative on Earth, while Boris also saw it as a way to overcome the differences between Bulgars and Slavs. Bulgaria was officially recognized as a patriarchate by Constantinople in 927, Serbia in 1346, and Russia in 1589. All of these nations had been converted long before these dates.

Late Middle Ages and the early Renaissance (1300–1520)

Avignon Papacy and the Western Schism

The Avignon Papacy, sometimes referred to as the Babylonian Captivity, was a period from 1309 to 1378 during which seven popes resided in Avignon, in modern-day France. In 1309, Pope Clement V moved to Avignon in southern France. Confusion and political animosity waxed, as the prestige and influence of Rome waned without a resident pontiff. Troubles reached their peak in 1378 when Gregory XI died while visiting Rome. A papal conclave met in Rome and elected Urban VI, an Italian. Urban soon alienated the French cardinals, and they held a second conclave electing Robert of Geneva to succeed Gregory XI, beginning the Western Schism.

Criticism of Catholic Church abuses and corruption 

John Wycliffe, an English scholastic philosopher and Christian theologian best known for denouncing the abuses and corruption of the Catholic Church, was a precursor of the Protestant Reformation. He emphasized the supremacy of the Bible and called for a direct relationship between God and the human person, without interference by priests and bishops. The Lollards, a Proto-Protestant Christian movement that followed the teachings of Wycliffe, played a role in the English Reformation. Jan Hus, a Czech Christian theologian based in Prague, was influenced by Wycliffe and spoke out against the abuses and corruption he saw in the Catholic Church. His followers became known as the Hussites, a Proto-Protestant Christian movement that followed the teachings of Jan Hus, who became the best known representative of the Bohemian Reformation. He was a forerunner of the Protestant Reformation, and his legacy has become a powerful symbol of Czech culture in Bohemia. Both Wycliffe and Hus were accused of heresy and subsequently condemned to the death penalty for their outspoken views about the Catholic Church.

Renaissance and the Catholic Church

The Renaissance was a period of great cultural change and achievement, marked in Italy by a classical orientation and an increase of wealth through mercantile trade. The city of Rome, the papacy, and the papal states were all affected by the Renaissance. On the one hand, it was a time of great artistic patronage and architectural magnificence, where the Church commissioned such artists as Michelangelo, Brunelleschi, Bramante, Raphael, Fra Angelico, Donatello, and Leonardo da Vinci. On the other hand, wealthy Italian families often secured episcopal offices, including the papacy, for their own members, some of whom were known for immorality, such as Alexander VI and Sixtus IV.

In addition to being the head of the Church, the pope became one of Italy's most important secular rulers, and pontiffs such as Julius II often waged campaigns to protect and expand their temporal domains. Furthermore, the popes, in a spirit of refined competition with other Italian lords, spent lavishly both on private luxuries but also on public works, repairing or building churches, bridges, and a magnificent system of aqueducts in Rome that still function today.

Fall of Constantinople

In 1453, Constantinople fell to the Ottoman Empire. Eastern Christians fleeing Constantinople, and the Greek manuscripts they carried with them, is one of the factors that prompted the literary renaissance in the West at about this time. The Ottoman government followed Islamic law when dealing with the conquered Christian population. Christians were officially tolerated as people of the Book. As such, the Church's canonical and hierarchical organisation were not significantly disrupted, and its administration continued to function. One of the first things that Mehmet the Conqueror did was to allow the Church to elect a new patriarch, Gennadius Scholarius. However, these rights and privileges, including freedom of worship and religious organisation, were often established in principle but seldom corresponded to reality. Christians were viewed as second-class citizens, and the legal protections they depended upon were subject to the whims of the sultan and the sublime porte. The Hagia Sophia and the Parthenon, which had been Christian churches for nearly a millennium, were converted into mosques. Violent persecutions of Christians were common and reached their climax in the Armenian, Assyrian, and Greek genocides.

Early modern period (c. 1500–c. 1750)

Colonization and Christianization of the Americas

Beginning with the first wave of European colonization, the religious discrimination, persecution, and violence toward the Indigenous peoples' native religions was systematically perpetrated by the European Christian colonists and settlers from the 15th-16th centuries onwards.

During the Age of Discovery and the following centuries, the Spanish and Portuguese colonial empires were the most active in attempting to convert the Indigenous peoples of the Americas to the Christian religion. Pope Alexander VI issued the Inter caetera bull in May 1493 that confirmed the lands claimed by the Kingdom of Spain, and mandated in exchange that the Indigenous peoples be converted to Catholic Christianity. During Columbus's second voyage, Benedictine friars accompanied him, along with twelve other priests. With the Spanish conquest of the Aztec empire, evangelization of the dense Indigenous populations was undertaken in what was called the "spiritual conquest". Several mendicant orders were involved in the early campaign to convert the Indigenous peoples. Franciscans and Dominicans learned Indigenous languages, such as Nahuatl, Mixtec, and Zapotec. One of the first schools for Indigenous peoples in Mexico was founded by Pedro de Gante in 1523. The friars aimed at converting Indigenous leaders, with the hope and expectation that their communities would follow suit. In densely populated regions, friars mobilized Indigenous communities to build churches, making the religious change visible; these churches and chapels were often in the same places as old temples, often using the same stones. "Native peoples exhibited a range of responses, from outright hostility to active embrace of the new religion." In central and southern Mexico where there was an existing Indigenous tradition of creating written texts, the friars taught Indigenous scribes to write their own languages in Latin letters. There is significant body of texts in Indigenous languages created by and for Indigenous peoples in their own communities for their own purposes. In frontier areas where there were no settled Indigenous populations, friars and Jesuits often created missions, bringing together dispersed Indigenous populations in communities supervised by the friars in order to more easily preach the gospel and ensure their adherence to the faith. These missions were established throughout the Spanish colonies which extended from the southwestern portions of current-day United States through Mexico and to Argentina and Chile.

As slavery was prohibited between Christians and could only be imposed upon non-Christian prisoners of war and/or men already sold as slaves, the debate on Christianization was particularly acute during the early 16th century, when Spanish conquerors and settlers sought to mobilize Indigenous labor. Later, two Dominican friars, Bartolomé de Las Casas and the philosopher Juan Ginés de Sepúlveda, held the Valladolid debate, with the former arguing that Native Americans were endowed with souls like all other human beings, while the latter argued to the contrary to justify their enslavement. In 1537, the papal bull Sublimis Deus definitively recognized that Native Americans possessed souls, thus prohibiting their enslavement, without putting an end to the debate. Some claimed that a native who had rebelled and then been captured could be enslaved nonetheless.

When the first Franciscans arrived in Mexico in 1524, they burned the sacred places dedicated to the Indigenous peoples' native religions. However, in pre-Columbian Mesoamerica, burning the temple of a conquered group was standard practice, shown in Indigenous manuscripts, such as Codex Mendoza. Conquered Indigenous groups expected to take on the gods of their new overlords, adding them to the existing pantheon. They likely were unaware that their conversion to Christianity entailed the complete and irrevocable renunciation of their ancestral religious beliefs and practices. In 1539, Mexican bishop Juan de Zumárraga oversaw the trial and execution of the Indigenous nobleman Carlos of Texcoco for apostasy from Christianity. Following that, the Catholic Church removed Indigenous converts from the jurisdiction of the Inquisition, since it had a chilling effect on evangelization. In creating a protected group of Christians, Indigenous men no longer could aspire to be ordained Christian priests.

Throughout the Americas, the Jesuits were active in attempting to convert the Indigenous peoples to Christianity. They had considerable success on the frontiers in New France, Portuguese Brazil, and Antonio de Vieira, S.J; and in Paraguay, almost an autonomous state within a state.

Protestant Reformation

In the early 16th century, attempts were made by the Christian theologians Martin Luther and Huldrych Zwingli, along with many others, to reform the Catholic Church. They considered the roots of corruption within the Catholic Church and its ecclesiastical structure to be doctrinal, rather than simply a matter of depravity, moral weakness, or lack of ecclesiastical discipline, and thus advocated for God's autonomy in redemption, and against voluntaristic notions that salvation could be earned by people. The Reformation is usually considered to have started with the publication of the Ninety-five Theses by Luther in 1517, although there was no schism until the 1521 Diet of Worms. The edicts of the Diet condemned Luther and officially banned citizens of the Holy Roman Empire from defending or propagating his ideas.

The word Protestant is derived from the Latin protestatio, meaning declaration, which refers to the letter of protestation by Lutheran princes against the decision of the Diet of Speyer in 1529, which reaffirmed the edict of the Diet of Worms ordering the seizure of all property owned by persons guilty of advocating Lutheranism. The term "Protestant" was not originally used by Reformation era leaders; instead, they called themselves "evangelical", emphasising the "return to the true gospel (Greek: euangelion)".

Early protest was against corruptions such as simony, the holding of multiple church offices by one person at the same time, episcopal vacancies, and the sale of indulgences. The Protestant position also included the Five solae (sola scriptura, sola fide, sola gratia, solus Christus, soli Deo gloria), the priesthood of all believers, Law and Gospel, and the two kingdoms doctrine. The three most important traditions to emerge directly from the Reformation were the Lutheran, Reformed, and Anglican traditions, though the latter group identifies as both "Reformed" and "Catholic", and some subgroups reject the classification as "Protestant".

Unlike other reform movements, the English Reformation began by royal influence. Henry VIII considered himself a thoroughly Catholic king, and in 1521 he defended the papacy against Luther in a book he commissioned entitled, The Defence of the Seven Sacraments, for which Pope Leo X awarded him the title Fidei Defensor (Defender of the Faith). However, the king came into conflict with the papacy when he wished to annul his marriage with Catherine of Aragon, for which he needed papal sanction. Catherine, among many other noble relations, was the aunt of Emperor Charles V, the papacy's most significant secular supporter. The ensuing dispute eventually lead to a break from Rome and the declaration of the King of England as head of the English Church, which saw itself as a Protestant church navigating a middle way between Lutheranism and Reformed Christianity, but leaning more towards the latter. Consequently, England experienced periods of reform and also Counter-Reformation. Monarchs such as Edward VI, Lady Jane Grey, Mary I, Elizabeth I, and Archbishops of Canterbury such as Thomas Cranmer and William Laud, pushed the Church of England in different directions over the course of only a few generations. What emerged was the Elizabethan Religious Settlement and a state church that considered itself both "Reformed" and "Catholic" but not "Roman", and other unofficial more radical movements, such as the Puritans. In terms of politics, the English Reformation included heresy trials, the exiling of Roman Catholic populations to Spain and other Roman Catholic lands, and censorship and prohibition of books.

According to the Merton Thesis, there was a positive correlation between the rise of English Puritanism and German Pietism on the one hand, and early experimental science on the other.

Radical Reformation

The Radical Reformation represented a response to corruption both in the Catholic Church and in the expanding Magisterial Protestant movement led by Martin Luther and many others. Beginning in Germany and Switzerland in the 16th century, the Radical Reformation gave birth to many radical Protestant groups throughout Europe. The term covers radical reformers like Thomas Müntzer and Andreas Karlstadt, the Zwickau prophets, and Anabaptist Christians, most notably the Amish, Mennonites, Hutterites, the Bruderhof Communities, and Schwarzenau Brethren.

Counter-Reformation

The Counter-Reformation was the response of the Catholic Church to the Protestant Reformation. In terms of meetings and documents, it consisted of the Confutatio Augustana, the Council of Trent, the Roman Catechism, and the Defensio Tridentinæ fidei. In terms of politics, the Counter-Reformation included heresy trials, the exiling of Protestant populations from Catholic lands, the seizure of children from their Protestant parents for institutionalized Catholic upbringing, a series of wars, the Index Librorum Prohibitorum (the list of prohibited books), and the Spanish Inquisition.

Although Protestant Christians were excommunicated in an attempt to reduce their influence within the Catholic Church, at the same time they were persecuted during the Counter-Reformation, prompting some to live as crypto-Protestants (also termed Nicodemites), against the urging of John Calvin who urged them to live their faith openly. Crypto-Protestants were documented as late as the 19th century in Latin America.

The Council of Trent (1545–1563) initiated by Pope Paul III addressed issues of certain ecclesiastical corruptions such as simony, absenteeism, nepotism, the holding of multiple church offices by one person, and other abuses. It also reasserted traditional practices and doctrines of the Church, such as the episcopal structure, clerical celibacy, the seven Sacraments, transubstantiation (the belief that during mass the consecrated bread and wine truly become the body and blood of Christ), the veneration of relics, icons, and saints (especially the Blessed Virgin Mary), the necessity of both faith and good works for salvation, the existence of purgatory and the issuance (but not the sale) of indulgences. In other words, all Protestant doctrinal objections and changes were uncompromisingly rejected. The council also fostered an interest in education for parish priests to increase pastoral care. Milan's Archbishop Saint Charles Borromeo set an example by visiting the remotest parishes and instilling high standards.

Catholic Reformation

Simultaneous to the Counter-Reformation, the Catholic Reformation consisted of improvements in art and culture, anti-corruption measures, the founding of the Jesuits, the establishment of seminaries, a reassertion of traditional doctrines and the emergence of new religious orders aimed at both moral reform and new missionary activity. Also part of this was the development of new yet orthodox forms of spirituality, such as that of the Spanish mystics and the French school of spirituality.

The papacy of St. Pius V was known not only for its focus on halting heresy and worldly abuses within the Church, but also for its focus on improving popular piety in a determined effort to stem the appeal of Protestantism. Pius began his pontificate by giving large alms to the poor, charity, and hospitals, and the pontiff was known for consoling the poor and sick as well as supporting missionaries. These activities coincided with a rediscovery of the ancient Christian catacombs in Rome. As Diarmaid MacCulloch states, "Just as these ancient martyrs were revealed once more, Catholics were beginning to be martyred afresh, both in mission fields overseas and in the struggle to win back Protestant northern Europe: the catacombs proved to be an inspiration for many to action and to heroism."

Catholic missions were carried to new places beginning with the new Age of Discovery, and the Roman Catholic Church established missions in the Americas.

Trial of Galileo

The Galileo affair, in which Galileo Galilei came into conflict with the Roman Catholic Church over his support of heliocentrism, is often considered a defining moment in the history of the relationship between religion and science. In 1610, Galileo published his Sidereus Nuncius (Starry Messenger), describing the surprising observations that he had made with the new telescope. These and other discoveries exposed major difficulties with the understanding of the heavens that had been held since antiquity, and raised new interest in radical teachings such as the heliocentric theory of Copernicus. In reaction, many scholars maintained that the motion of the earth and immobility of the sun were heretical, as they contradicted some accounts given in the Bible as understood at that time. Galileo's part in the controversies over his theological and philosophical positions culminated in his trial and sentencing in 1633, on a grave suspicion of heresy.

Puritans in North America

The colonization with the most impact in the New World was that of Protestant English Puritans in North America. Unlike the Spanish or French, the English colonists made surprisingly little effort to evangelize the native peoples. The Puritans, or Pilgrims, left England so that they could live in an area with Puritanism established as the exclusive civic religion. Though they had left England because of the suppression of their religious practice, most Puritans had thereafter originally settled in the Low Countries but found the licentiousness there, where the state hesitated from enforcing religious practice, as unacceptable, and thus they set out for the New World and the hopes of a Puritan utopia.

Late modern period (c. 1750–c. 1945)

Christian revivalism
Christian revivalism refers to the Calvinist and Wesleyan revival, called the "Great Awakening" in North America, which saw the development of evangelical Congregationalist, Presbyterian, Baptist, and new Methodist churches.

Great Awakenings

The First Great Awakening was a wave of religious enthusiasm among Protestants in the American colonies c. 1730–1740, emphasising the traditional Reformed virtues of Godly preaching, rudimentary liturgy, and a deep sense of personal guilt and redemption by Christ Jesus. Historian Sydney E. Ahlstrom saw it as part of a "great international Protestant upheaval" that also created pietism in Germany, the Evangelical Revival, and Methodism in England. It centred on reviving the spirituality of established congregations and mostly affected Congregational, Presbyterian, Dutch Reformed, German Reformed, Baptist, and Methodist churches, while also spreading within the slave population. The Second Great Awakening (1800–1830s), unlike the first, focused on the unchurched and sought to instill in them a deep sense of personal salvation as experienced in revival meetings. It also sparked the beginnings of groups such as the Mormons, the Restoration Movement and the Holiness movement. The Third Great Awakening began from 1857 and was most notable for taking the movement throughout the world, especially in English speaking countries. The final group to emerge from the "great awakenings" in North America was Pentecostalism, which had its roots in the Methodist, Wesleyan, and Holiness movements, and began in 1906 on Azusa Street in Los Angeles. Pentecostalism would later lead to the Charismatic movement.

Restorationism

Restorationism refers to the belief that a purer form of Christianity should be restored using the early church as a model. In many cases, restorationist groups believed that contemporary Christianity, in all its forms, had deviated from the true, original Christianity, which they then attempted to "reconstruct", often using the Book of Acts as a "guidebook" of sorts. Restorationists do not usually describe themselves as "reforming" a Christian church continuously existing from the time of Jesus, but as restoring the Church that they believe was lost at some point. "Restorationism" is often used to describe the Stone-Campbell Restoration Movement.

The term "restorationist" is also used to describe the Jehovah's Witness movement, founded in the late 1870s by Charles Taze Russell. The term can also be used to describe the Latter Day Saint movement, including the Church of Jesus Christ of Latter-day Saints (LDS Church), the Community of Christ and numerous other Latter Day Saints sects. Latter Day Saints, also known as Mormons, believe that Joseph Smith was chosen to restore the original organization established by Jesus, now "in its fullness", rather than to reform the church.

Eastern Orthodoxy

The Russian Orthodox Church held a privileged position in the Russian Empire, expressed in the motto of the late empire from 1833: Orthodoxy, Autocracy, and Populism. Nevertheless, the Church reform of Peter I in the early 18th century had placed the Orthodox authorities under the control of the tsar. An ober-procurator appointed by the tsar ran the committee which governed the Church between 1721 and 1918: the Most Holy Synod.
The Church became involved in the various campaigns of russification, and was accused of involvement in Russian anti-semitism, despite the lack of an official position on Judaism as such.

The Bolsheviks and other Russian revolutionaries saw the Church, like the tsarist state, as an enemy of the people. Criticism of atheism was strictly forbidden and sometimes lead to imprisonment. Some actions against Orthodox priests and believers included torture, being sent to prison camps, labour camps or mental hospitals, as well as execution.

In the first five years after the Bolshevik revolution, 28 bishops and 1,200 priests were executed. This included people like the Grand Duchess Elizabeth Fyodorovna who was at this point a monastic. Executed along with her were: Grand Duke Sergei Mikhailovich Romanov; the Princes Ioann Konstantinvich, Konstantin Konstantinovich, Igor Konstantinovich and Vladimir Pavlovich Paley; Grand Duke Sergei's secretary, Fyodor Remez; and Varvara Yakovleva, a sister from the Grand Duchess Elizabeth's convent.

Trends in Christian theology
Liberal Christianity, sometimes called liberal theology, is an umbrella term covering diverse, philosophically informed religious movements and moods within late 18th, 19th and 20th-century Christianity. The word "liberal" in liberal Christianity does not refer to a leftist political agenda or set of beliefs, but rather to the freedom of dialectic process associated with continental philosophy and other philosophical and religious paradigms developed during the Age of Enlightenment.

Fundamentalist Christianity is a movement that arose mainly within British and American Protestantism in the late 19th century and early 20th century in reaction to modernism and certain liberal Protestant groups that denied doctrines considered fundamental to Christianity yet still called themselves "Christian". Thus, fundamentalism sought to re-establish tenets that could not be denied without relinquishing a Christian identity, the "fundamentals": inerrancy of the Bible, the principle of sola scriptura, the Virgin Birth of Jesus, the doctrine of substitutionary atonement, the bodily resurrection of Jesus, and the imminent return of Jesus Christ.

Under Communism and Nazism

Under the state atheism of countries in the Soviet Union and the Eastern Bloc, Christians of many denominations experienced persecution, with many churches and monasteries being destroyed, as well as clergy being executed.

The position of Christians affected by Nazism is highly complex. Pope Pius XI declared – Mit brennender Sorge – that Fascist governments had hidden "pagan intentions" and expressed the irreconcilability of the Catholic position and totalitarian fascist state worship, which placed the nation above God, fundamental human rights, and dignity. His declaration that "Spiritually, [Christians] are all Semites" prompted the Nazis to give him the title "Chief Rabbi of the Christian World".

Catholic priests were executed in concentration camps alongside Jews; for example, 2,600 Catholic priests were imprisoned in Dachau, and 2,000 of them were executed (cf. Priesterblock). A further 2,700 Polish priests were executed (a quarter of all Polish priests), and 5,350 Polish nuns were either displaced, imprisoned, or executed. Many Catholic laymen and clergy played notable roles in sheltering Jews during the Holocaust, including Pope Pius XII. The head rabbi of Rome became a Catholic in 1945 and, in honour of the actions the pope undertook to save Jewish lives, he took the name Eugenio (the pope's first name). A former Israeli consul in Italy claimed: "The Catholic Church saved more Jewish lives during the war than all the other churches, religious institutions, and rescue organisations put together."

The relationship between Nazism and Protestantism, especially the German Lutheran Church, was complex. Though many Protestant church leaders in Germany supported the Nazis' growing anti-Jewish activities, some such as Dietrich Bonhoeffer (a Lutheran pastor) of the Confessing Church, a movement within Protestantism that strongly opposed Nazism, were strongly opposed to the Third Reich. Bonhoeffer was later found guilty in the conspiracy to assassinate Hitler and executed.

Contemporary Christianity

Second Vatican Council

On 11 October 1962, Pope John XXIII opened the Second Vatican Council, the 21st ecumenical council of the Catholic Church. The council was "pastoral" in nature, interpreting dogma in terms of its scriptural roots, revising liturgical practices, and providing guidance for articulating traditional Church teachings in contemporary times. The council is perhaps best known for its instructions that the Mass may be celebrated in the vernacular as well as in Latin.

Ecumenism

Ecumenism broadly refers to movements between Christian groups to establish a degree of unity through dialogue. Ecumenism is derived from Greek  (oikoumene), which means "the inhabited world", but more figuratively something like "universal oneness". The movement can be distinguished into Catholic and Protestant movements, with the latter characterised by a redefined ecclesiology of "denominationalism" (which the Catholic Church, among others, rejects).

Over the last century, moves have been made to reconcile the schism between the Catholic Church and the Eastern Orthodox churches. Although progress has been made, concerns over papal primacy and the independence of the smaller Orthodox churches has blocked a final resolution of the schism. On 30 November 1894, Pope Leo XIII published Orientalium Dignitas. On 7 December 1965, a Joint Catholic-Orthodox Declaration of Pope Paul VI and the Ecumenical Patriarch Athenagoras I was issued lifting the mutual excommunications of 1054.

Some of the most difficult questions in relations with the ancient Eastern Churches concern some doctrine (i.e. Filioque, scholasticism, functional purposes of asceticism, the essence of God, Hesychasm, Fourth Crusade, establishment of the Latin Empire, Uniatism to note but a few) as well as practical matters such as the concrete exercise of the claim to papal primacy and how to ensure that ecclesiastical union would not mean mere absorption of the smaller Churches by the Latin component of the much larger Catholic Church (the most numerous single religious denomination in the world) and the stifling or abandonment of their own rich theological, liturgical and cultural heritage.

With respect to Catholic relations with Protestant communities, certain commissions were established to foster dialogue and documents have been produced aimed at identifying points of doctrinal unity, such as the Joint Declaration on the Doctrine of Justification produced with the Lutheran World Federation in 1999. Ecumenical movements within Protestantism have focused on determining a list of doctrines and practices essential to being Christian and thus extending to all groups which fulfill these basic criteria a (more or less) co-equal status, with perhaps one's own group still retaining a "first among equal" standing. This process involved a redefinition of the idea of "the Church" from traditional theology. This ecclesiology, known as denominationalism, contends that each group (which fulfills the essential criteria of "being Christian") is a sub-group of a greater "Christian Church", itself a purely abstract concept with no direct representation, i.e., no group, or "denomination", claims to be "the Church". This ecclesiology is at variance with other groups that indeed consider themselves to be "the Church". The "essential criteria" generally consist of belief in the Trinity, belief that Jesus Christ is the only way to bring forgiveness and eternal life, and that Jesus died and rose again bodily.

Evangelical movement, Pentecostalism, and Charismatic Christianity 

In reaction to these developments, Christian fundamentalism emerged as a socio-political-religious movement in rejection of what many Christians perceived as radical influences of philosophical humanism that were affecting the Christian religion, according to them. Especially targeting critical approaches to the interpretation of the Bible, and trying to blockade the inroads made into their churches by secular scientific assumptions, fundamentalist Christians began to appear in various Christian denominations as numerous independent movements of resistance to the developments that they regarded as a drift away from historical Christianity. Over time, the Evangelical movement has divided into two main wings, with the label Fundamentalist following one branch, while the term Evangelical has become the preferred banner of the more moderate side. Although both strands of Evangelicalism primarily originated in the English-speaking world, the majority of Evangelicals today live elsewhere in the world.

World Christianity 

World Christianity, otherwise known as "global Christianity", has been defined both as a term that attempts to convey the global nature of the Christian religion and an academic field of study that encompasses analysis of the histories, practices, and discourses of Christianity as a world religion and its various forms as they are found on the six continents. However, the term often focuses on "non-Western Christianity" which "comprises (usually the exotic) instances of Christian faith in 'the global South', in Asia, Africa, and Latin America". It also includes Indigenous or diasporic forms of Christianity in the Caribbean, South America, Western Europe, and North America.

See also

 Christian anarchism
 Christian communism
 Christian fascism
 Christian pacifism
 Christian socialism
 Christianity and Islam
 Christianity and Judaism
 Christianity and Neoplatonism
 Christianity and other religions
 Christianity and Paganism
 Christianity and violence
 Christianization
 Criticism of Christianity
 History of Christian theology
 History of the Eastern Orthodox Church
 History of Oriental Orthodoxy
 History of Protestantism
 History of the Catholic Church
 List of Christian denominations
 List of Christian movements
 Mandaeism
 Persecution of Christians
 Rise of Christianity during the Fall of Rome
 Role of the Christian Church in civilization
 Timeline of Christian missions
 Timeline of Christianity
 Timeline of the Roman Catholic Church

References

Sources

Printed sources

 
 
 
 
 
 
 Brown, Schuyler. The Origins of Christianity: A Historical Introduction to the New Testament.  Oxford University Press (1993). 
 
 

 
 
 
 
 
 
 
 

 
 
 
 
 
 
 
 
 
 

 
 
 
 
 
 
 

 
 
 
 

 
 
 

 
 
 

 Johnson, L.T., The Real Jesus, San Francisco, Harper San Francisco, 1996

 
 
 

 
 
 Ludemann, Gerd, What Really Happened to Jesus? trans. J. Bowden, Louisville, Kentucky: Westminster John Knox Press, 1995
 

 
 
 
 
 
 
 
 

 
 
 

 
 
 

 
 

 
 

 
 

 
 
 
 
 
 

Web-sources

 E.P. Sanders, Jaroslav Jan Pelikan, Jesus, Encyclopædia Britannica

Further reading

 Bowden, John. Encyclopedia of Christianity (2005), 1406 pp excerpt and text search
 
 Carrington, Philip. The Early Christian Church (2 vol. 1957) vol 1; online edition vol 2
 
 ; 
 
 
 
 Holt, Bradley P. Thirsty for God: A Brief History of Christian Spirituality (2nd ed. 2005)
 Jacomb-Hood, Anthony. Rediscovering the New Testament Church. CreateSpace (2014). .
 Johnson, Paul. A History of Christianity (1976) excerpt and text search
  excerpt and text search and highly detailed table of contents
  excerpt and text search; 
 Livingstone, E. A., ed. The Concise Oxford Dictionary of the Christian Church (2nd ed. 2006) excerpt and text search online at Oxford Reference
 McLeod, Hugh, and Werner Ustorf, eds. The Decline of Christendom in Western Europe, 1750–2000 (2003) 13 essays by scholars; online edition
 McGuckin, John Anthony. The Orthodox Church: An Introduction to its History, Doctrine, and Spiritual Culture (2010), 480pp excerpt and text search
 McGuckin, John Anthony. The Encyclopedia of Eastern Orthodox Christianity (2011), 872pp
 Moore, Edward Caldwell. The Spread of Christianity in the Modern World. Chicago, Ill: University of Chicago Press, 1919.
 Muraresku, Brian C. The Immortality Key: The Secret History of the Religion with No Name. Macmillan USA. 2020. 
 
 
 
 Stark, Rodney. The Rise of Christianity (1996)
 Tomkins, Stephen. A Short History of Christianity (2006) excerpt and text search

External links

The following links give an overview of the history of Christianity:
 
 History of Christianity Reading Room: Extensive online resources for the study of global church history (Tyndale Seminary).
 Dictionary of the History of Ideas: Christianity in History
 Dictionary of the History of Ideas: Church as an Institution
 Sketches of Church History From AD 33 to the Reformation by Rev. J. C Robertson, M.A., Canon of Canterbury
 
 A History of Christianity in 15 Objects online series in association with Faculty of Theology, Uni. of Oxford from September 2011

The following links provide quantitative data related to Christianity and other major religions, including rates of adherence at different points in time:
 American Religion Data Archive
 Early Stages of the Establishment of Christianity
 Theandros, a journal of Orthodox theology and philosophy, containing articles on early Christianity and patristic studies.
 Historical Christianity, A timeline with references to the descendants of the early church.
 Reformation Timeline, A short timeline of the Protestant Reformation.
 Fourth-Century Christianity